Cytharopsis exquisita is a species of sea snail, a marine gastropod mollusk in the family Mangeliidae.

Description
The length of the shell attains 16 mm.

The shell is narrowly and distantly longitudinally ribbed, transversely very finely corded. It is whitish, lineated and banded with chestnut.

Distribution
This marine species occurs off the Philippines.

References

 Smith, E.A. (1882b) Diagnoses of new species of Pleurotomidae in the British Museum. Annals and Magazine of Natural History, series 5, 10, 296–306

External links
  Tucker, J.K. 2004 Catalog of recent and fossil turrids (Mollusca: Gastropoda). Zootaxa 682: 1–1295.

exquisita
Gastropods described in 1882